The Slovenia men's national basketball team represents Slovenia in international basketball competitions, and is managed by the Basketball Federation of Slovenia. Since the independence of Slovenia in 1991, the national team has competed at every EuroBasket, and reached the knockout stage at every championship since 2005. Their greatest achievement overall at the tournament came at EuroBasket 2017, where they won all nine games and became European champions.

As of February 2023, Slovenia is ranked 7th in the FIBA World Ranking.

History
Before Slovenia's independence in 1991, Slovenian players represented Yugoslavia. Slovenia joined the International Basketball Federation in 1992 and played its first official game on 22 June 1992 against Bulgaria in the qualification rounds for the 1992 Summer Olympics.

FIBA World Cup
Slovenia debuted at the FIBA World Cup in the 2006 edition after qualifying as the sixth-placed team of the EuroBasket 2005. In the 2010 and 2014 editions, Slovenia reached the quarter-finals; their highest overall finish is seventh place in 2014.

EuroBasket
Between May and June 1993, Slovenia competed in the qualifiers for the EuroBasket 1993, where the team won all seven games and therefore qualified for its first EuroBasket. At the main tournament, held in Germany, Slovenia finished in 14th place out of 16 teams with one win and two defeats.

Slovenia did not reach the knockout stages of the competition until the 2005 edition, where the team, coached by Aleš Pipan, reached the quarter-finals for the first time. In 2009, Slovenia reached the semi-finals for the first time after eliminating Croatia in the quarter-finals with a 67–65 victory. In the semi-finals, Slovenia lost to Serbia after overtime, and later to Greece in the third place game, finishing the competition in fourth place. In the next two tournaments, in 2011 and 2013, Slovenia was eliminated in the quarter-finals by Spain and France, respectively. In 2015, Slovenia failed to reach the quarter-finals for the first time since the 2003 edition after losing to Latvia in the round of 16.

At EuroBasket 2017, Slovenia, captained by Goran Dragić and managed by Igor Kokoškov, won the championship after winning nine consecutive games, including victories against the 2013 winners France and the 2015 winners Spain. Dragić, who scored 35 points in the final against Serbia, was named the most valuable player of the tournament.

2020 Summer Olympics

Slovenia qualified for the men's basketball tournament at the 2020 Summer Olympics after competing in the 2020 FIBA Men's Olympic Qualifying Tournaments, winning the tournament in Kaunas. They won all games in the Group B, defeating Poland and Angola. In the Final round, they defeated Venezuela 98–70, and qualified for the final against Lithuania. Slovenia defeated Lithuania 96–85 in Kaunas, led by Luka Dončić (31 points, 11 rebounds, 13 assists), who with his triple-double sent Slovenia to their first Olympic appearance. Dončić was also proclaimed as the MVP of the tournament. 

At the Olympics, Slovenia was drawn in the group with the host Japan, Argentina, and reigning world champion Spain. In the opening game, they beat Argentina 118–100. With his 48 points in this game, Dončić tied with Eddie Palubinskas for the second highest points scored in a match in the history of the Olympics. In the next game Slovenia defeated host Japan 116–81. In the final match of the group stage, Slovenia faced Spain, the reigning world champions, and beat them 95–87. Mike Tobey, who was named player of the day by FIBA, recorded a double-double with 16 points and 14 rebounds, while Klemen Prepelič scored the crucial three-pointer that put Slovenia ahead 86–85 two and a half minutes before the end.

The win gave them the group's top seed, and they were set to face Germany in the quarter-finals. Slovenia won their quarter-final, defeating Germany 94–70. Slovenia then lost the dramatic semi-final against France by one point, 90–89. In the last seconds of the game, Nicolas Batum blocked Prepelič's layup attempt, thus preventing Slovenia from reaching the final. In the bronze medal game, Slovenia played against Australia, and lost 107–93. Slovenia finished their inaugural Olympic tournament in fourth place, and Dončić was selected in the All-Star Team of the tournament.

Competitive record

FIBA World Cup

Olympic Games

EuroBasket

Record against other teams at World Cup

Last updated: 9 September 2014

Record against other teams at EuroBasket

Last updated: 14 September 2022

Team

Current roster
Slovenian roster for the 2023 FIBA Basketball World Cup qualifiers in February 2023.

Depth chart

Head coaches
Since 1992, the Slovenian national team has been managed by a total of twelve head coaches. Zmago Sagadin and Jure Zdovc are the only coaches with more than one spell.

1990s and 2000s

2010s and 2020s

Statistics

Players in bold are still active with Slovenia.

Most appearances

As of 14 November 2022. Statistics include official competitive matches only.

Top scorers

As of 14 November 2022. Statistics include official competitive matches only.

Past rosters
1993 EuroBasket: finished 14th among 16 teams

4 Roman Horvat, 5 Marko Tušek, 6 Jaka Daneu, 7 Darko Mirt, 8 Primoz Bačar, 9 Jure Zdovc, 10 Boštjan Leban, 11 Teoman Alibegović, 12 Boris Gorenc, 13 Marijan Kraljević, 14 Slavko Kotnik, 15 Žarko Durisić (Coach: Janez Drvarič)

1995 EuroBasket: finished 12th among 14 teams

4 Roman Horvat, 5 Matjaž Tovornik, 6 Jaka Daneu, 7 Walter Jeklin, 8 Marijan Kraljević, 9 Jure Zdovc, 10 Marko Tušek, 11 Teoman Alibegović, 12 Marko Milič, 13 Boris Gorenc, 14 Slavko Kotnik, 15 Aleš Kunc (Coach: Zmago Sagadin)

1997 EuroBasket: finished 14th among 16 teams

4 Walter Jeklin, 5 Goran Jagodnik, 6 Jaka Daneu, 7 Radoslav Nesterović, 8 Aleš Kunc, 9 Jure Zdovc, 10 Marko Tušek, 11 Teoman Alibegović, 12 Marko Milič, 13 Boris Gorenc, 14 Ivica Jurković, 15 Radovan Trifunović (Coach: Andrej Urlep)

1999 EuroBasket: finished 10th among 16 teams

4 Jure Zdovc, 5 Walter Jeklin, 6 Jaka Daneu, 7 Sani Bečirović, 8 Marijan Kraljević, 9 Matjaž Tovornik, 10 Matjaž Smodiš, 11 Goran Jagodnik, 12 Marko Milič, 13 Ivica Jurković, 14 Radoslav Nesterović, 15 Ervin Dragsič (Coach: Boris Zrinski)

2001 EuroBasket: finished 15th among 16 teams

4 Beno Udrih, 5 Jaka Lakovič, 6 Boris Gorenc, 7 Sani Bečirović, 8 Marijan Kraljević, 9 Matjaž Smodiš, 10 Marko Tušek, 11 Goran Jagodnik, 12 Marko Milič, 13 Ivica Jurković, 14 Ariel McDonald, 15 Radoslav Nesterović (Coach: Boris Zrinski)

2003 EuroBasket: finished 10th among 16 teams

4 Goran Jurak, 5 Jaka Lakovič, 6 Boris Gorenc, 7 Simon Petrov, 8 Marijan Kraljević, 9 Boštjan Nachbar, 10 Slavko Duščak, 11 Marko Tušek, 12 Marko Milič, 13 Ivica Jurković, 14 Jurica Golemac, 15 Primož Brezec (Coach: Slobodan Subotić)

2005 EuroBasket: finished 6th among 16 teams

4 Goran Jurak, 5 Jaka Lakovič, 6 Aleksandar Ćapin, 7 Sani Bečirović, 8 Radoslav Nesterović, 9 Nebojša Joksimović, 10 Boštjan Nachbar, 11 Erazem Lorbek, 12 Marko Milič, 13 Marko Maravič, 14 Uroš Slokar, 15 Primož Brezec (Coach: Aleš Pipan)

2006 FIBA World Cup: finished 9th among 24 teams

4 Goran Jurak, 5 Jaka Lakovič, 6 Sašo Ožbolt, 7 Sani Bečirović, 8 Radoslav Nesterović, 9 Beno Udrih, 10 Boštjan Nachbar, 11 Željko Zagorac, 12 Marko Milič, 13 Goran Dragić, 14 Uroš Slokar, 15 Primož Brezec (Coach: Aleš Pipan)

2007 EuroBasket: finished 7th among 16 teams

4 Sandi Čebular, 5 Jaka Lakovič, 6 Aleksandar Ćapin, 7 Goran Dragić, 8 Radoslav Nesterović, 9 Matjaž Smodiš, 10 Uroš Slokar, 11 Jaka Klobučar, 12 Goran Jagodnik, 13 Domen Lorbek, 14 Gašper Vidmar, 15 Erazem Lorbek (Coach: Aleš Pipan)

2009 EuroBasket: finished 4th among 16 teams

4 Uroš Slokar, 5 Jaka Lakovič, 6 Samo Udrih, 7 Primož Brezec, 8 Matjaž Smodiš  (C), 9 Jaka Klobučar, 10 Boštjan Nachbar, 11 Goran Dragić, 12 Goran Jagodnik, 13 Domen Lorbek, 14 Jurica Golemac, 15 Erazem Lorbek (Coach: Jure Zdovc)

2010 FIBA World Cup: finished 8th among 24 teams

4 Uroš Slokar, 5 Jaka Lakovič (C), 6 Hasan Rizvić, 7 Sani Bečirović, 8 Jaka Klobučar, 9 Samo Udrih, 10 Boštjan Nachbar, 11 Goran Dragić, 12 Goran Jagodnik, 13 Miha Zupan, 14 Gašper Vidmar, 15 Primož Brezec (Coach: Memi Bečirović)

2011 EuroBasket: finished 7th among 24 teams

4 Uroš Slokar, 5 Jaka Lakovič (C), 6 Luka Rupnik, 7 Sašo Ožbolt, 8 Matjaž Smodiš, 9 Samo Udrih, 10 Edo Murić, 11 Goran Dragić, 12 Goran Jagodnik, 13 Zoran Dragić, 14 Mirza Begić, 15 Erazem Lorbek (Coach: Božidar Maljković)

2013 EuroBasket: finished 5th among 24 teams

4 Uroš Slokar, 5 Jaka Lakovič (C), 6 Jure Balažič, 7 Nebojša Joksimović, 8 Edo Murić, 9 Jaka Blažič, 10 Boštjan Nachbar, 11 Goran Dragić, 12 Zoran Dragić, 13 Domen Lorbek, 14 Gašper Vidmar, 15 Mirza Begić (Coach: Božidar Maljković)

2014 FIBA World Cup: finished 7th among 24 teams

4 Jure Balažič, 5 Uroš Slokar, 6 Aleksej Nikolić, 7 Klemen Prepelič, 8 Edo Murić, 9 Jaka Blažič, 10 Miha Zupan, 11 Goran Dragić (C), 12 Zoran Dragić, 13 Domen Lorbek, 14 Jaka Klobučar, 15 Alen Omić (Coach: Jure Zdovc)

2015 EuroBasket: finished 12th among 24 teams

1 Nebojša Joksimović, 5 Luka Rupnik, 7 Klemen Prepelič, 9 Jaka Blažič, 10 Mitja Nikolić, 12 Zoran Dragić, 13 Miha Zupan, 15 Jure Balažič (C), 17 Saša Zagorac, 23 Alen Omić, 24 Jaka Klobučar, 55 Uroš Slokar (Coach: Jure Zdovc)

2017 EuroBasket: finished 1st  among 24 teams

0 Anthony Randolph, 1 Matic Rebec, 3 Goran Dragić (C) & (MVP), 6 Aleksej Nikolić, 7 Klemen Prepelič, 8 Edo Murić, 9 Jaka Blažič, 14 Gašper Vidmar, 17 Saša Zagorac, 22 Žiga Dimec, 31 Vlatko Čančar, 77 Luka Dončić (Coach: Igor Kokoškov)

2020 Olympic Games: finished 4th among 12 teams

5 Luka Rupnik, 6 Aleksej Nikolić, 7 Klemen Prepelič, 8 Edo Murić (C), 10 Mike Tobey, 11 Jaka Blažič, 15 Gregor Hrovat, 27 Žiga Dimec, 30 Zoran Dragić, 31 Vlatko Čančar, 55 Jakob Čebašek, 77 Luka Dončić (Coach: Aleksander Sekulić)

2022 EuroBasket: finished 6th among 24 teams

3 Goran Dragić (C), 4 Žiga Samar, 5 Luka Rupnik, 6 Aleksej Nikolić, 7 Klemen Prepelič, 8 Edo Murić, 10 Mike Tobey, 11 Jaka Blažič, 27 Žiga Dimec, 30 Zoran Dragić, 31 Vlatko Čančar, 77 Luka Dončić (Coach: Aleksander Sekulić)

See also

Slovenia women's national basketball team
Slovenia men's national under-20 basketball team
Slovenia men's national under-19 basketball team
Slovenia men's national under-17 basketball team

Notes

References

External links

 
FIBA profile
Slovenia National Team – Men at Eurobasket.com
Slovenia Basketball Records at FIBA Archive

 
Men's national basketball teams
 
FIBA EuroBasket-winning countries